Reynosa–McAllen, also known as McAllen–Reynosa, or simply as Borderplex, is one of the six international conurbations along the Mexico–U.S border. The city of Reynosa is situated in the Mexican state of Tamaulipas, on the southern bank of the Rio Grande, while the city of McAllen is located in the American state of Texas, directly north across the bank of the Rio Grande. This area has a population of roughly 1,500,000, making it the largest and most populous in the state of Tamaulipas, and third most populous on the US–Mexico border.

The Reynosa–McAllen area has been one of the fastest-growing urban areas in the United States in recent years.

Municipalities and counties
 Reynosa Municipality
 Río Bravo Municipality
 Hidalgo County, Texas

Communities
Note: Principal cities are bolded.

Cities in Mexico
 Reynosa
 Río Bravo
 Nuevo Progreso

Cities in the U.S.

Census-designated placesNote: All census-designated places are unincorporated.''

Unincorporated places
 Hargill, Texas
 El Gato, Texas
 Runn, Texas
 Val Verde, Texas

See also
San Diego–Tijuana
El Paso–Juárez
Laredo–Nuevo Laredo
Metropolitan area of Tampico
Matamoros–Brownsville metropolitan area
List of Texas metropolitan areas
Metropolitan areas of Mexico
Transnational conurbations Mexico/USA

References 

Transborder agglomerations
Metropolitan areas of Mexico
Metropolitan areas of Texas
McAllen, Texas
Edinburg, Texas
Reynosa
Lower Rio Grande Valley
Geography of McAllen, Texas
Geography of Tamaulipas
Geography of Hidalgo County, Texas
Populated places in Hidalgo County, Texas
Populated places in Tamaulipas